The 300th Military Intelligence Brigade (Linguist) is a United States Army formation, subordinate to the United States Army Intelligence and Security Command (INSCOM) part of the Utah Army National Guard and headquartered at the Utah National Guard Headquarters building in Draper, Utah.

Formed in 1988 from the 142nd Military Intelligence Battalion, the 300th provides linguistic support to the U.S. Army throughout the world. Numbering approximately 1400, with approximately 90% being trained Army linguists, the soldiers are organized as five-person teams, trained in HUMINT (such as interrogators), counterintelligence, and SIGINT (such as voice intercept and analyst) skills. The brigade covers 19 documented languages, heavily oriented toward Arabic, Persian, and Korean.

Order of Battle
  Headquarters and Headquarters Company (Utah Army National Guard)
  141st Military Intelligence Battalion (Utah Army National Guard)
  142nd Military Intelligence Battalion (Utah Army National Guard)
  223rd Military Intelligence Battalion (California Army National Guard)
  260th Military Intelligence Battalion (Florida Army National Guard)
  341st Military Intelligence Battalion (Washington Army National Guard)
  415th Military Intelligence Battalion (Louisiana Army National Guard)

Service
Units have taken part in U.S. military operations worldwide from the Gulf War to current operations in Bosnia-Herzegovina, Kosovo, Iraq, Kuwait and Afghanistan, and played a major role in protecting the 2002 Olympic Winter Games in Salt Lake City.

See also
 Central Security Service
 Defense Language Institute
 Military Intelligence Service (United States)
 Military Intelligence Corps (United States Army)

References

Military units and formations established in 1988
300